Na Magha CLG is a Gaelic Athletic Association club based in Derry, Northern Ireland. The club is a member of the Derry GAA and caters for camogie and hurling teams from U5 (Campa Éamoin)to senior level. They are the only hurling and camogie teams in Derry City.

Na Magha operate from the beautiful Páirc Na Magha which is situated adjacent to the Amelia Earhart Centre within the confines of Ballyarnet Country Park.

History
Na Magha senior hurlers have recently enjoyed their biggest success since winning the Derry Senior Championship in 1993 by making it to an Ulster league division 3 final after a narrow victory over Naomh Colmcille.

Notable players
Tomas Lally
Alan Grant
Breandan Quigley
Conor Sexton

See also
List of Gaelic games clubs in Derry

References

https://www.namagha.ie/

Gaelic games clubs in County Londonderry
Hurling clubs in County Londonderry
1982 establishments in Northern Ireland